Soini Helle (15 April 1914 – 1992) was a Finnish chess player.

Biography
In the early 1950s Soini Helle was one of Finland's leading chess players. He played mainly in domestic chess tournaments and Finnish Chess Championships.

Soini Helle played for Finland in the Chess Olympiad:
 In 1950, at first reserve board in the 9th Chess Olympiad in Dubrovnik (+0, =9, -1).

References

External links

Soini Helle chess games at 365chess.com

1914 births
1992 deaths
People from Jokioinen
Finnish chess players
Chess Olympiad competitors
20th-century chess players